The Forney Independent School District is a school district based in Forney, Texas, United States.

The district serves the city of Forney, the city of Talty, the small Kaufman County portion of Mesquite (no residents), and other unincorporated areas in Kaufman County.

The district received the academic accountability rating of "academically acceptable" for the 2006-2007 school year based on the results of the Texas Assessment of Knowledge and Skills-based on standards set by the Texas Education Agency (TEA). This marks the third consecutive year that Forney ISD had received this accountability rating, and meant that a minimum of 50-69% of students met state standards in language arts and social studies,  a minimum of 35-69% of students  met state standards in mathematics, and a minimum of 25-69% of students met state standards in science.

In 2009, the school district was rated "academically acceptable" by the Texas Education Agency.

Administrators 
Superintendent,  Dr. Justin Terry

Dealing with growth 
Forney ISD, according to a 2005 article in The Dallas Morning News, is the fourth-fastest growing school district in Texas. A new middle school was opened in the 2006-2007 school year, and remodeling of the old middle school was underway.

After a bond issue for a second high school repeatedly failed in previous years, funds for a new high school were approved in May 2007. The current high school, originally intended to serve as a middle school, has a population that outgrows the building despite recent wing additions.

School uniforms
All Forney ISD students are required to wear school uniforms..

The TEA specified that the parents and/or guardians of students zoned to a school with uniforms may apply for a waiver to opt out of the uniform policy so their children do not have to wear the uniform; parents must specify bona fide reasons, such as religious reasons or philosophical objections. Forney ISD devised a procedure to verify the parents' reasons for requesting exemptions to the uniform policy 

In 2022 the district announced that hooded clothing would be no longer allowed. Additionally, the district at that time began only allowing students in grades 4 and below to wear: skirts, skorts, and dresses. An online petition was made that protested the dress code change.

Schools

Secondary schools

High schools 

 Forney High School (Forney)
 North Forney High School (unincorporated Kaufman County - Windmill Farms development)
 An alternative education campus: Forney Academic Center (DAEP and GOALS)

Middle schools 

 Brown Middle School (unincorporated Kaufman County - Windmill Farms development)
 Jackson Middle School (Forney)
 Warren Middle School (Forney)

Intermediate schools 

 Rhea Intermediate School (unincorporated Kaufman County - Fox Hollow)
 Rhodes Intermediate School (Forney)
 Smith Intermediate School (unincorporated Kaufman County - Windmill Farms)

Primary schools 
 
 Blackburn Elementary School (unincorporated Kaufman County - Windmill Farms development)
 Claybon Elementary School (Forney)
 Criswell Elementary School (Forney)
 Crosby Elementary School (Forney)
 Griffin Elementary School (unincorporated Kaufman County - Devonshire development) 
 Henderson Elementary School (Forney)
 Johnson Elementary School (Forney)
 Lewis Elementary School (unincorporated Kaufman County - Travis Ranch development)

Historical District Accountability Ratings
The Texas Education Agency has ranked the district:

 2013 - Exemplary
 2012 - Exemplary
 2011 - Recognized
 2010 - Exemplary
 2009 - Recognized
 2008 - Academically Acceptable
 2007 - Academically Acceptable 
 2006 - Academically Acceptable 
 2005 - Academically Acceptable 
 2004 - Recognized

See also

List of school districts in Texas

References

External links
 

School districts in Kaufman County, Texas
School districts established in 1897